Yusuf Başer (born February 4, 1980 in Istanbul, Turkey) is a Turkish karateka competing in the kumite open division. He is a member of the İstanbul Büyükşehir Belediyesi S.K.

Achievements
2010
  1st World Clubs Cup - November 20, Istanbul TUR - kumite team
  8th European Karate Regions Championships - May 29, Warsaw POL - kumite team

2009
  7th European Karate Regions Championships - May 30, Madrid ESP - kumite team
  44th European Championships - May 8, Zagreb CRO - kumite team

2008
  19th World Championships - November 13, Tokyo JAP - kumite team

2007
  42nd European Championships - May 4, Bratislava SVK - kumite open

2006
  41st European Championships - May 5, Stavanger NOR - kumite team

2005
  15th Mediterranean Games - June 25, Almeria ESP - kumite open
  40th European Championships - May 13, Tenerife ESP - kumite open 
  Islamic Solidarity Games - April 9–14, Mecca SAU - kumite open
  Dutch Open -March 12, Rotterdam NED - kumite +80 kg

2004
  39th European Championships - May 7, Moscow, RUS - kumite open

2002
  9th Balkan Senior Karate Championships - September 28 - kumite +80 kg
  9th Balkan Senior Karate Championships - September 28 - kumite team

References

1980 births
Sportspeople from Istanbul
Living people
Turkish male karateka
Istanbul Büyükşehir Belediyespor athletes
Mediterranean Games bronze medalists for Turkey
Competitors at the 2005 Mediterranean Games
Mediterranean Games medalists in karate
Islamic Solidarity Games competitors for Turkey
21st-century Turkish people